James D. "Jim" Sinegal (born January 1, 1936) is an American billionaire businessman who is the co-founder and former CEO of the Costco Wholesale Corporation, an international retail chain.

Early life
He was born January 1, 1936, into a Catholic working-class family in Pittsburgh, Pennsylvania. He attended St. Lawrence O'Toole primary school, Central Catholic High School (Pittsburgh), Helix High School in La Mesa, California, and earned an AA at San Diego City College in 1955. He attended San Diego State University, graduating with a Bachelor of Arts degree in 1959.

Career 
After Sinegal started as a grocery bagger at FedMart in 1955, he discovered that he loved the retail business, and was excited by the opportunities at this rapidly growing retailer. At FedMart, he worked his way up to executive vice president in charge of merchandising and operations. He was a vice president of merchandising for Builders Emporium from 1977 to 1978, an executive vice president for the Price Company from 1978 to 1979. From 1979 to 1983, he worked with Sinegal/Chamberlin and Associates, a company that acted as a broker and sales representative for food and non-food products. Together with Seattle retailer Jeff Brotman, he co-founded Costco. From 1983 until his December 31, 2011, retirement, Sinegal served as Costco's president and CEO. As CEO, Sinegal was well known for traveling to each location every year, to inspect them personally. Sinegal's innovations made Costco the first "warehouse club" to include fresh food, eye-care clinics, pharmacies, and gas stations in its mix of goods and services.

Sinegal was a protégé of Sol Price, widely considered to be the "father" of the "warehouse club" concept. Sinegal is known for a benevolent style of management rooted in the belief that employees who are treated well, will in turn, treat/serve customers well. Sinegal, through Costco, provided his employees — at every level of the company, including the stores — compensation and benefits that are much higher than retail industry norms. For example, over 90% of Costco employees qualify for employer-sponsored health insurance; the U.S. retail industry average is just under sixty percent. As a result, Costco has the lowest employee turnover rate in retail.

In 1993, when growing competition threatened both Price Club and Costco Wholesale, Sinegal was invited to a partial merger. The two companies entered into a partial merger just after Price's earnings dropped to 40%. The new company, named PriceCostco, Inc., focused heavily on international expansion, opening stores in Mexico, South Korea, and England. Despite best efforts to recover losses, sales continued to drop. Robert Price and Jim Sinegal had different opinions regarding company direction and recovery policies. The breakup was formally announced in 1994. Price's breakaway company was named as Price Enterprises. Sinegal still continued to manage PriceCostco, Inc.

In 1997, the name of Sinegal's company was changed to Costco Wholesale.

In an interview published in the Houston Chronicle on July 17, 2005, he told Steven Greenhouse that he did not care about Wall Street analysts who had criticized him for putting good treatment of employees and customers ahead of pleasing shareholders. Investors might want higher earnings, but Sinegal stated, "We want to build a company that will still be here 50 and 60 years from now." A favorite quote attributed to Sinegal, in part about his philosophy on dealing with success, is, "You have to take the shit with the sugar." Investors who bought $10,000 of Costco stock in 1992 found it worth $43,564 just ten years later — a return of 354% (15.855%, annually). A 2012 CNBC documentary stated that from 1985 until Sinegal's retirement, the stock's value had increased by five thousand percent. Costco's two highest-sales years to date, were Sinegal's final two years as CEO.

In 2009, Sinegal was considered one of "The TopGun CEOs" by Brendan Wood International, an advisory agency.

Retirement 
On January 1, 2012, Sinegal retired as CEO of Costco Wholesale, continued to serve as Company Advisor and Director, and was succeeded by his long-term Costco colleague W. Craig Jelinek in 2012. Sinegal retired from the Board of Directors in January 2018.

Personal life 
In 2008, Sinegal was part of an eleventh-hour, local ownership group that committed to invest $450 million ($150 million from each of the three co-owners) for the renovation of Seattle's KeyArena, and to purchase the NBA's Seattle SuperSonics franchise. The bid failed, however, as NBA commissioner David Stern had already made a private deal with an Oklahoma-based ownership group to move the team to Oklahoma City (where it was renamed the Oklahoma City Thunder).

Sinegal and his wife, Janet, have three children. Sinegal's son David owns and operates the Sinegal Estate Winery in St. Helena, California.

Sinegal is an avowed Democrat, and spoke at the 2012 Democratic National Convention. Sinegal has hosted President Barack Obama at his home on two occasions.

Sinegal received an honorary doctorate from Dartmouth College alongside Jake Tapper and others in June 2017.

References 

American retail chief executives
1936 births
Living people
Costco people
Businesspeople from Pittsburgh
San Diego State University alumni
20th-century American businesspeople
21st-century American businesspeople
People from Hunts Point, Washington
Central Catholic High School (Pittsburgh) alumni